Bart Bonte is a Belgian independent game developer most well-known for his numerous abstract puzzle games, among them Sugar, Sugar (2012), Yellow (2017) and Green (2020). Some of the ideas he has built games around include a bath duck, a CRT monitor in a field, and his daughter's teddy bear. He releases his games under the moniker bontegames.

Biography
Bonte grew up in Belgium, and enjoyed playing games on his Commodore Amiga as a kid. From that time forward, Bonte knew he wanted to be a game developer, and in 2005, he released his first game, an escape the room game made in Adobe Flash. By 2017, he had developed and released over 50 games.

References

External links
 Official website

Browser game developers
Year of birth missing (living people)
Living people
Place of birth missing (living people)
Indie video game developers